Mesoamerica (lit. "mid/middle America") is a historical region and cultural area in southern North America and most of Central America.

Mesoamerica(n) or Meso-America(n) may also refer to:
 Mesoamerican language area, a linguistic area or sprachbund comprising numerous indigenous languages in Mesoamerica that exhibit certain similarities
 Mesoamerican Barrier Reef System, system of coral reefs in the Caribbean Sea along the coast of Yucatán and Central America
 Mesoamerican Biological Corridor, a biodiversity conservation initiative formed in 1997 to interconnect a number of protected areas in Mesoamerica
 Mesoamerican region, a trans-national economic territory comprising Central America and the southeastern states of Mexico
 Universidad Mesoamericana, a university in Guatemala with campuses in Guatemala City and Quetzaltenango

See also 
 Mexico
 Americas (terminology)
 Central America (disambiguation)
 Middle America (disambiguation)